Bite This with Nadia G is an American food travelogue television series that aired on Cooking Channel. It was presented by chef and musician Nadia G. The series featured Nadia G traveling to different eateries and learning how to cook their signature items. The correspondents on the series had all appeared on Nadia G's previous series, Nadia G's Bitchin' Kitchen.

The pilot episode of Bite This aired on September 24, 2013. The series officially premiered on July 14, 2014 and ended on October 16, 2014, after one season.

Cast
 Nadia G  Herself
 Peter Koussioulas  Panos
 Ben Shaouli  Yeheskel Mizrahi, the Spice Agent
 Bart Rochon  Hans

Episodes

References

External links
 
 
 Tricon Films

2010s American cooking television series
2013 American television series debuts
2014 American television series endings
Cooking Channel original programming
English-language television shows
Food travelogue television series